Alexey Fyodorovich Zubov (1682–c.1741) was a Russian etcher.

Zubov and his brother Ivan were accepted as apprentices to their father Fyodor in the Kremlin icon shop at an early age.  In 1699 Alexey was apprenticed to the Dutch etcher Adrian Schoonebek by the order of Peter the Great.

His etchings of important events, people and monuments of the Tsar's Russia earned him great fame in his own lifetime.  The year of his death is unknown, but believed to be on or after 1750.

External links

Gallery of Zubov's works

1682 births
1741 deaths
Russian printmakers
Russian etchers